Doubles with Slight Pepper is a Canadian drama film, directed by Ian Harnarine and released in 2011.

The film stars Sanjiv Boodhu as Dhani, a young doubles vendor in Trinidad whose estranged father Ragbir (Errol Sitahal) returns from Toronto for the first time in many years to reveal that he is dying.

Accolades
The film won the Toronto International Film Festival Award for Best Canadian Short Film at the 2011 Toronto International Film Festival, and was named to TIFF's year-end Canada's Top Ten list.

In 2012, it won the Genie Award for Best Live Action Short Drama at the 32nd Genie Awards.

References

External links
 

2011 short films
2011 films
2011 drama films
Best Live Action Short Drama Genie and Canadian Screen Award winners
2010s English-language films
Canadian drama short films
2010s Canadian films